Jason Ballantine (born 1970) is an Australian film editor.  He was the president of the Australian Screen Editors guild from 2010 to 2013. He was nominated in the category of Best Editing in the 2005 Australian Film Institute Awards for his work on Wolf Creek. In 2019, we was inducted as a member of the American Cinema Editors.

Filmography

Short films

Television
 Hi-5 (1998)
 I'm a Celebrity...Get Me Out of Here! (2002)

References

External links

1970 births
Living people
Australian film editors
American Cinema Editors